Léognan is a commune in the Gironde department, Nouvelle-Aquitaine, southwestern France.

Population

Its inhabitants are called Léognanais.

Wine
It is located in the Graves area of the Bordeaux county, known for its red wine (Pessac-Léognan appellation):
 Château Haut-Bailly
 Domaine de Chevalier
 Château de Fieuzal
 Château Olivier
 Château Carbonnieux
 Château Malartic Lagravière

The processing plant for Cacolac has been located here since 2000.

See also
Communes of the Gironde department

References

Communes of Gironde